Jean Kemm (15 May 1874–1939) was a French stage and theater actor and film director.

Kemm was born Jules Adolphe Félix Bécheret in the 2nd arrondissement of  Paris and died in Paris in 1939.

Selected filmography
 André Cornélis (1918)
 André Cornélis (1927)
 Hai-Tang (1930)
 Atlantis (1930)
 The Polish Jew (1931)
 The Lacquered Box (1932)
 Miss Helyett (1933)
 The Barber of Seville (1933)

1874 births
1939 deaths
French male stage actors
French male film actors
French male silent film actors
French film directors
Silent film directors
20th-century French male actors